Penny Macmillan is a British journalist, who presented the news on Reporting Scotland for nearly ten years.  In March 2007 she decided to take a career break from the BBC to spend more time with her young family.  Penny was a familiar face at breakfast, weekends and at 22:25.  In the year before her departure, she could also be found co-presenting the main programme at 18:30.  Penny joined BBC Scotland in 1998 to present Newsline, a daily current affairs show on BBC Choice Scotland. Prior to that, Penny worked for Lookaround at Border Television in Carlisle.

References

People educated at St George's School, Edinburgh
BBC Scotland newsreaders and journalists
British women television journalists
Living people
British reporters and correspondents
Scottish women radio presenters
Scottish women television presenters
Year of birth missing (living people)